Séraphin Couvreur (EFEO Chinese transcription: kóu sái fēn; 14 January 1835 – 19 November 1919) was a French Jesuit missionary to China, sinologist, and creator of the EFEO Chinese transcription. The system devised by Couvreur of the École française d'Extrême-Orient was used in most of the French-speaking world to transliterate Chinese until the middle of the 20th century, after what it was gradually replaced by pinyin.

Biography

Couvreur arrived at the Catholic Jesuit mission in Hejian, Cangzhou. Also there worked Léon Wieger (1856–1933), another French Jesuit missionary.

Works
His edition of the 書經 Chou King (Shu Jing), with French and Latin translations, was used by Pound in the Rock Drill section of the Cantos (LXXXV – XCV).
  - , 1930, troisième édition}} 
 Les quatre livres. I. La Grande Étude. II. L'Invariable Milieu. (= Les Humanités d'Extrême-Orient. Textes de la Chine). Paris, Cathasia, 1895.
 Confucius: Entretiens de Confucius et de ses disciples. Les Quatre Livres, Band 3. Aus dem Chinesischen ins Französische und Lateinische übersetzt von Séraphin Couvreur. Paris/Leiden, Cathasia/Brill, ca. 1951 (Les Humanités d'Extrême-Orient).
 Meng Tzeu: Oeuvres de Meng Tzeu. Les Quatre Livres, Band 4. Aus dem Chinesischen ins Französische und Lateinische übersetzt von Seraphin Couvreur. Paris/Leiden, Cathasia/Brill, ca 1951.
 Cheu king. Traduction de Séraphin COUVREUR (1835–1919). Éditions Kuangchi Press, 4e édition, 1966, 556 pages. Fac-simile de l’édition Ho kien Fou, Imprimerie de la Mission Catholique, 1896.
 Chou king, Les Annales de la Chine, avec dessins. Traduction de Séraphin COUVREUR. Éditions You Feng, 1999, 464 pages. Fac-simile de l’édition Ho kien Fou, Imprimerie de la Mission Catholique, 1897.
 Tch'ouen Ts'iou / Tso Tchouan. La Chronique de la principaute de Lou. Drei Bände. Hg. von Séraphin Couvreur. Paris, Leiden u.a.: Cathasia, Brill u.a. 1951 (Les Humannités d'Extrême-Orient / Textes de la Chine).
 . .
 Dictionnaire classique de la langue chinoise. Ho Kien Fu, 1904. 
 I-li : Cérémonial. Texte chinois et trad. Hsien Hsien, Mission Catholique, 1916.  
 . .
 Dictionnaire français-chinois contenant les expressions les plus usitées de la langue mandarine. Ho Kien Fou, Impr. de la Mission catholique, 1908.
 Choix des documents, Ho Kien Fou, 1901.
 . 3. éd. Ho Kien Fu, Impr. de la Mission Catholique, 1911.  
 Géographie ancienne et moderne de la Chine. Hien Hien, Mission cath., 1917.  
 . Paris-Leiden, E.J. Brill-Cathasia-Soc. Les Belles Lettres, 1951 (2nd edition [1916]). -- Volume: Série Culturelle des Hautes Études de Tien-Tsin [1916]. Reprint Series: Les Humanités d'Extrême-Orient [1951]. Préface [edition 1916]: Parmi les ouvrages de la Chine, les  San Li  tiennent un rang distingué. Le premier, le  Li Ki , a été traduit en anglais par Legge; nous l'avons traduit en français. Le deuxième, le  Tcheou Li , a été traduit en français par Édouard Biot. Le troisième, le  I Li , a-t-il jamais été traduit en langue européenne ? Nous l'ignorons. Sans avoir la même importance que les deux autres, il n'est pas sans intérêt. Mais, pour le bien comprendre, il est nécessaire de recourir aux chapitres correspondants du  Li Ki . Il aurait été trop long de reporter ici en notes les explications contenues dans le  Li Ki . Il sera très utile de consulter souvent les gravures qui sont dans cet ouvrage, spécialement celle qui represente le plan du palais impérial, page 69. Les grandes maisons, les résidences des officiels étaient disposées à peu près de la même manière. La préface et l'introduction placées un tête de la traduction du Li Ki  fournissent des renseignements sur la formation, la disparition, la réapparition et les commentaires des trois  Li  [Hsien Hsien, janvier 1916].
 Guide de la conversation français-anglais-chinois, Couvreur, S[éraphin], S.J.; Guide to conversation in French, English and Chinese. 11. éd. Sien-Hsien dans le Tcheu Li, Mission cath., 1926.

References

External links
 

1835 births
1919 deaths
French Jesuits
French sinologists
French Roman Catholic missionaries
Jesuit missionaries
Roman Catholic missionaries in China
French expatriates in China